Geneva Airport , formerly and still unofficially known as Cointrin Airport, is the international airport of Geneva, the second most populous city in Switzerland. It surpassed the 15-million-passengers-a-year mark for the first time in December 2014. The airport serves as a hub for Swiss International Air Lines and easyJet Switzerland. It features a route network of flights mainly to European metropolitan and leisure destinations as well as some long-haul routes to North America, China, Africa, and the Middle East, amongst them Swiss International Air Lines' only long-haul service (to New York–JFK) outside of Zürich.

The airport lies entirely within Swiss territory, however, its northern limit runs along the Swiss–French border and the airport can be accessed from both countries. The freight operations are also accessible from both countries, making Geneva a European Union freight hub although Switzerland is not a member of the EU. The airport is partially in the municipality of Meyrin and partially in the municipality of Le Grand-Saconnex.

History

Early years
On 11 October 1919, the Grand Council of Geneva approved the establishment of an "airfield" at Meyrin. From 1926 to 1931, the airfield's wooden sheds were replaced by three concrete hangars. At the time, there was a small amount of air traffic, with Lufthansa flying from Berlin to Barcelona via Halle, Leipzig, Geneva and Marseille. Swissair also flew the Geneva–Lyon–Paris route through a codesharing agreement with Air Union. By 1930, there were six airlines that flew to Geneva Airport on seven different routes.

1937 saw construction of the first concrete runway; it measured . In 1938 eight airlines were flying to Geneva: Swissair, KLM, Lufthansa, Air France, Malert (Hungary), AB Aerotransport (Sweden), Alpar (Switzerland) and Imperial Airways (UK).

As part of the Federal Government's post-war planning for the nation's airports, Geneva was identified as one of four main urban airports that were to form the first tier of that system. Cointrin was noted as being well suited for extension and did not require a triangular runway arrangement as the prevailing winds are very regularly along a single axis. Authorities agreed to a 2.3M Swiss Francs project to build a first terminal in Geneva and in 1946 the new terminal – which is today used as Terminal 2 – was ready for use, and the runway was enlarged once more to 2000 m. In 1947 the first service to New York started with a Swissair Douglas DC-4. On 17 July 1959, the first jet aircraft landed in Geneva, an SAS Caravelle, and it was followed, 11 years later, by a TWA Boeing 747 which landed in 1970.

Development since the 1960s

This is unusually long for an airport of this size, and could only be built after some territory was exchanged between France and Switzerland. The northeastern end of the 1946 runway had also been the frontier between Geneva and the neighbouring French commune of Ferney-Voltaire. The runway extension needed to use land that was then French, and an international agreement was needed whereby the necessary land was transferred from France to Switzerland, and territory of identical size, also adjacent to Ferney-Voltaire, transferred in the opposite direction. In this way, Switzerland remained exactly the same size, and its neutrality remained unsullied. The extension also entailed the construction of the current tunnel leading to Ferney-Voltaire and of the joint border post on its northern side, which is unusual for Switzerland in that it is entirely on French territory. In the process, the old hamlet of La Limite disappeared, although as of April 2013 a building from that era still stands isolated within a motorway junction on the southern side of the runway.

In 1968, the construction of a second runway and a mid-field round terminal were proposed, but ultimately the concept was never realised. On 7 May 1968, Geneva Main Terminal was inaugurated, which was planned to accommodate 7 million passengers a year. This number was reached in 1985.

Despite there never being a regular Concorde service in Switzerland, the supersonic aircraft twice landed in Geneva. On 31 August 1976, more than 5000 people came to see the Concorde land.

In 1987, Geneva airport was linked to the Swiss rail system, with a new station built close to the main terminal. Since then, a number of changes have been made. Two of the three in-field terminals have been upgraded with jet bridges, and a new terminal has been built in front of the main terminal with 12 jet bridges, plus two ground floor gates.

The current number of passengers flying through Cointrin is around 15 million per year, and it's growing rapidly. One proposed solution to support the future 25 million passengers a year in 2030 is to (as in some countries) prevent aircraft carrying less than a hundred passengers, so there would be less traffic but more passengers. This proposal hasn't been approved yet. Officials are still thinking about finding another solution that could easily increase Geneva's Airport traffic. Geneva Cointrin Airport has only one runway, handling one aircraft about every 90 seconds between 6 am and midnight. Changes have already been made in the main terminal with the construction of a new check-in area, new restaurant and duty-free shops, as well as a new security checkpoint.

Facilities

Terminals
 

Geneva Airport has two passenger terminals: the newer and larger Terminal 1 (T1), which features the majority of flights, and the smaller and only seasonally used Terminal 2 (T2). It also has a Business Aviation Terminal, also known as Terminal 3 (T3).

Terminal 1
Terminal 1, also known as Main terminal (M) is divided into 5 piers, A, B, C, D and F.

Piers A, B, C and D are located in the Swiss side of Terminal 1. Passengers travelling from these gates (to Swiss or international destinations) check in at the main check-in hall and use the central security check above the check in hall. Pier A is located directly in front of the main shopping area and serves destinations in the Schengen area. Pier B consists of two non-Schengen circular satellite buildings which are reached from the shopping area via an underground walkway, which also houses passport control. Pier C, also non-Schengen, is to the right of Pier A and houses long haul flights using wide body aircraft. Pier D consists of one circular satellite and one bus gate building, which is split between Schengen and non-Schengen passengers on different floors. These are reached via underground walkways from the left end of Pier A.

Before Switzerland's integration into the Schengen Area in 2008, Pier F, also known as the French Sector, was used exclusively for passengers arriving from, or departing to destinations in France. It has two gates with jet bridges and four bus gates. The French Sector exists as a stipulation of an agreement between France and the Canton of Geneva dating from the 1960s, and enables travel between the neighboring French region of the Pays de Gex and the airport while avoiding Swiss territory and customs. The French Sector area still exists for passengers arriving from French destinations who wish to exit directly to French territory and avoid Swiss customs controls, although passport control and immigration checks have been dropped as part of the Schengen Treaty. Buses to French ski resorts south of Geneva nowadays use the Swiss sector, since the road distance is much shorter through Geneva, and the passport control is dropped also at the border south of Geneva.

In June 2016, Geneva Airport management announced that they will start upgrading the main check-in hall in terminal 1. This will add one thousand square metres to the actual check-in area and help to cope with the higher passenger volume that the airport faces every year. The renovated check-in hall was fully opened by the end of 2017.

Long-haul pier Aile Est

The airport announced in 2012 a plan to replace the current, outdated long-haul section (Pier C) of the terminal, which originally was intended to be an interim solution back in 1975, with a completely reconstructed facility. Construction originally was delayed by several years by Swissair moving its long haul operation to Zurich in 1996. The September 11, 2001 attacks and the bankruptcy of Swissair in 2001 delayed it furthermore. Lately, a few airlines such as Emirates, Etihad Airways, Qatar Airways, United Airlines, and Swiss International Air Lines have started to use the current facility. The need for this new pier was then urgent. The extension of the airport was opposed by some associations (such as NOÉ21).

In December 2021, construction of the new Aile Est (East Wing) was completed. It is a completely new extension of the terminal replacing the old Pier C in the same location. The new facility is 520 m long and is able to handle six widebody long-haul aircraft at once directly at the building. This building is ecofriendly, electricity produced by 5,000 m2 of solar panels, more than 100 geothermal probes for heat pumps, glazed facades for natural light, additional LED lighting, recovery of rainwater, optimum thermal insulation with triple glazing, eliminates bus rides on the tarmac, and finally power supply and hot / cold direct 3 additional positions instead of an external diesel power.

The new terminal pier is in operation since 14 December 2021 and is used for all long-haul flights and several non-Schengen destinations.

Terminal 2

Terminal 2 is only used during the winter charter season. This was the original terminal at Geneva Airport. It was built in 1946 and remained in use until the 1960s when the Main Terminal opened. Facilities at Terminal 2 are poor, with only one restaurant and no duty-free shops. Passengers check-in and pass through security checks at this terminal, and then take a low floor bus to piers A, B, C and D at T1. Arriving passengers are bussed directly from the aircraft to T2 and then pass through passport control (if needed) and collect their baggage there. Geneva Airport wanted to refurbish T2 as a low-cost terminal. At this time EasyJet was the major low-cost airline in Geneva with up to 80 flights a day during winter. Other major airlines at GVA threatened to leave the airport if EasyJet had its own terminal with lower landing charges. Since then, there has been no information about an upgrade of T2 facilities.

Business Aviation Terminal
The Business Aviation Terminal, or Terminal 3 (T3), is located at the south-west end of the airport, about 2 km from Terminal 1. This terminal is a hub for private charter jet companies (also known as Fixed-Base Operators, or FBOs) that offer facilities including VIP lounges, private immigration, and customs screening. Parking at Terminal 3 is limited.

Runways
Adjacent to the commercial runway is a smaller, parallel, grass runway (04L/22R) for light aircraft. Since its opening, the runway had been known as 05/23 until September 13, 2018, when it was changed to 04/22 due to the North Magnetic Pole moving. Usually, runway 22 is used when the wind is calm.

Airlines and destinations
The following airlines offer regular scheduled and charter flights at Geneva Airport:

Other facilities
 The airline Baboo had its head office on the grounds of the airport and in Grand-Saconnex.
 Geneva International Airport hosts an office of the International Air Transport Association (IATA).

Statistics

Route statistics

Passenger development

Ground transport

Train

There is a railway station with trains to Geneva-Cornavin station, and other cities in Switzerland.

Bus
There are local buses that stop at the airport. There are also buses to and from Annecy, France, and also seasonal buses to ski resort Chamonix in France and ski resorts in Switzerland. Many transfer companies operate shared transfers in the winter to many French ski resorts. Winter weekends see dozens of coaches at the nearby Charter terminal (former cargo terminal) meeting charter flights from all over Europe, but primarily the UK. These take holidaymakers to/from ski resorts in France, Switzerland and Italy. The buses in general go from the Swiss sector since this shortens the driving distance to most destinations.

Incidents and accidents
 In 1950, Air India Flight 245, a Lockheed Constellation, crashed into Mont Blanc while descending toward Geneva.
 In 1966, a very similar accident occurred when Air India Flight 101, a Boeing 707, crashed into Mont Blanc while descending toward Geneva.
 On 17 October 1982, an Egypt Air Boeing 707-366C, SU-APE struck the ground short of runway 23, bounced then slid off the left side of the runway, turned 270 degrees and continued sliding backwards. The right wing separated and a fire which broke out was quickly extinguished by the airport emergency services. Although the plane was a complete write off, the 172 passengers and 10 crew all survived.
 On 23 July 1987, a hijacker was arrested by Swiss authorities on board an Air Afrique DC-10 after the plane had landed at Geneva to refuel. One passenger was shot and killed by the hijacker before he was overpowered by the crew prior to the plane being stormed by the authorities. 1 crew member and 3 other passengers were injured during the incident.
 On 2 September 1998, Swissair Flight 111 from New York-JFK to Geneva, operated by a McDonnell Douglas MD-11, suffered an inflight fire and crashed into the Atlantic Ocean near St. Margarets Bay, Nova Scotia, killing all 229 people on board.
 On 20 March 1999, an Iberia MD-87, EC-GRL, had to land without its front undercarriage.
On 17 February 2014, Ethiopian Airlines Flight 702 on scheduled service departing from Addis Ababa at 00:30 (local time) scheduled to arrive in Rome at 04:40 (local time) was forced to proceed to Geneva airport. The Boeing 767-300 (tail ET-AMF) was flying north over Sudan when it changed radio frequency to squawk 7500—which is used in case of hijacking. Nearing Geneva, the pilots communicated with air traffic control to inquire about possibility of hijackers receiving asylum in Switzerland. The aircraft circled the airport several times, before landing around 6:00 in the morning with one engine and less than 10 minutes of fuel remaining. The airport remained closed as the aircraft stayed on the tarmac. At 7:12 local time, the pilots communicated to ATC that they would be ready to disembark passengers in five minutes. The co-pilot of the plane was found to be the hijacker and was arrested. No passengers were harmed.

In popular culture
 The old airport building, located next to the current building, is shown in The Adventures of Tintin story "The Calculus Affair".

See also
 Transport in Switzerland

References

Notes

External links

 
 
 

1919 establishments in Switzerland
Airports established in 1919
Airports in Switzerland
Binational airports
Buildings and structures in Geneva
France–Switzerland border crossings
Meyrin
Transport in Geneva
20th-century architecture in Switzerland